Amselina cedestiella is a moth of the family Autostichidae. It is found in Bulgaria, North Macedonia, Greece, Ukraine and Russia. It is also found in Asia Minor.

References

Moths described in 1868
Moths of Europe
Amselina
Moths of Asia